This is an alphabetical list of notable baseball players born in Arizona who have played in Major League Baseball.


A

 Jeremy Accardo
 Jeremy Affeldt
 Beau Allred
 Brian Anderson
 George Arias

B

 Dave Baldwin
 Brian Banks
 Brian Bannister
 T. J. Beam
 Cody Bellinger
 Gil Blanco
 Marshall Boze
 Dallas Braden
 Charles Brewer
 Brian Broderick
 Keith Brown
 Cory Burns
 Dan Butler

C

 Kole Calhoun
 D. J. Carrasco
 Hap Collard
 Mike Cosgrove
 Daniel Coulombe

D

 Lum Davenport
 Jaff Decker
 Flame Delhi
 John Denny
 Chris Duncan
 Shelley Duncan

E

 Andre Ethier
 Nick Evans

G

 Gary Gentry
 Dan Graham

H

 J. J. Hardy
 Ron Hassey
 Billy Hatcher
 Solly Hemus
 Gil Heredia
 Shea Hillenbrand
 Rich Hinton
 Jack Howell
 Bob Howry
 Rex Hudler
 Jeff Huson

J

 Elliot Johnson
 Rankin Johnson, Jr.
 Tommy Joseph

K

 Alex Kellner
 Walt Kellner
 Jason Kershner
 Ian Kinsler

L

 Lerrin LaGrow
 Don Lee
 Hank Leiber
 Eddie Leon
 Kyle Lobstein
 Albie Lopez
 Scott Lydy

M

 Clarence Maddern
 Alex Madrid
 Lou Marson
 Doug Mathis
 Pat McCoy
 Kurt Miller
 Brad Mills
 Doug Mirabelli
 Willie Morales

N

 Ricky Nelson
 Brett Nicholas
 Don Nicholas
 Lou Novikoff

O

 Rudy Owens

P

 Matt Pagnozzi
 Tom Pagnozzi
 James Pazos
 Adam Pettyjohn
 Steve Phoenix
 Bob Porter
 Colin Porter
 Andy Pratt
 Jason Pridie

R

 Cody Ransom
 Jack Redmond
 Fred Rico
 Stefen Romero

S

 Chris Sáenz
 Anthony Sanders
 Jay Schlueter
 Dave Schmidt
 Anthony Shumaker
 Eric Sogard
 Jason Stanford
 Dave Stapleton
 Mel Stocker

V

 Max Venable
 Jamie Vermilyea
 Ed Vosberg

W

 Tom Wilhelmsen
 Vance Wilson
 Alan Wirth
 Tim Wood

References

Players Born in Arizona - Baseball-Reference.com

Baseball players from Arizona
Arizona sports-related lists